Below is a list of Arab organizations by area of interest.

Cultural organizations
Arab States Broadcasting Union
Arab Chess Federation

Economic organizations
Arab Industrial Development and Mining Organization
Arab Monetary Fund
Arab Organization for Industrialization
Council of Arab Economic Unity
Greater Arab Free Trade Area – a treaty made by several Arab countries to make an Arab Common Market. The treaty was signed in 1997.
Gulf Cooperation Council – a minor Arab organization, concerned with economic cooperation, It includes all Arab Persian Gulf states except Iraq. Yemen and Iraq are both possible members of the organization.
Organization of the Petroleum Exporting Countries

Educational organizations
Arab Open University
Association of Arab Universities
Association of Arab and European Universities
Fawakih

Political organizations
Arab League – an organization that includes 22 members and 2 observers, and concentrates mainly on Political issues rather than Economical and Social ones.
Arab Maghreb Union – a minor Arab organization that includes, Mauritania, Morocco, Algeria, Libya and Tunisia. The organization was affected greatly in its sufficiency by the ongoing conflict in Western Sahara.

Scientific organizations
Arab Forum for Environment and Development (AFED)

Sports organizations
Pan Arab Games
Union of Arab Football Associations (UAFA)

See also
 List of Arab companies

References

Organizations
 
Arab organizations